Aleksander Nikolaevich Omelyanchuk (Ukrainian: Омельянчук Олександр Миколайович; 27 July 1947 – 10 February 2022) was a Hungarian-born Ukrainian physicist and academic.

Life and career 
Born in Budapest, Omelyanchuk graduated from the National University of Kharkiv in 1970, and from 1972 he worked as a researcher at the Verkin Institute for Low Temperature Physics and Engineering. He authored over 200 scientific papers and his researches mainly focused in the fields of   spectroscopy, mesoscopic physics, quantum engineering and particularly superconductivity. 

During his life Omelyanchuk was the recipient of several awards and honors, including the State Prize of Ukraine in Science and Technology and the Verkin award of the National Academy of Sciences of Ukraine for his work Theory and experimental implementation of Josephson qubits for quantum computers. He was the head of the Superconducting and Mesoscopic Structures and Devices department of the Verkin Institute for over 16 years. 

Omelyanchuk died on 10 February 2022, at the age of 74.

References

External links
 
 Aleksander Omelyanchuk at Justia

1947 births
2022 deaths
Soviet physicists
Ukrainian physicists
People from Budapest
National University of Kharkiv alumni
Laureates of the State Prize of Ukraine in Science and Technology